The 1972 Atlantic hurricane season was a cycle of the annual tropical cyclone season in the Atlantic Ocean in the Northern Hemisphere. It was a significantly below average season, having only four fully tropical named storms, the fewest since 1930. It was one of only five Atlantic hurricane seasons since 1944 to have no major hurricanes, the others being 1968, 1986, 1994, and 2013. The season officially began on June 1, 1972 and ended on November 30, 1972. These dates, adopted by convention, historically describe the period in each year when most tropical systems form. However, storm formation is possible at any time of the year, as demonstrated in 1972 by the formation of Subtropical Storm Alpha on May 23. The season's final storm, Subtropical Storm Delta, dissipated on November 7.

The season produced nineteen tropical or subtropical cyclones, of which seven intensified into tropical or subtropical storms; three became hurricanes, of which only but only one, Betty, had sustained winds greater than minimum hurricane force. Despite its relative inactivity, the 1972 season resulted in one of the worst natural disasters in American history, Hurricane Agnes. Agnes was a weak but large storm that initially made landfall on the Florida Panhandle before moving up the eastern United States. The hurricane killed 122 people and caused $2.1 billion (1972 USD) in damage, mostly due to flooding in Pennsylvania and New York.

This timeline documents tropical cyclone formations, strengthening, weakening, landfalls, extratropical transitions, and dissipations during the season. It includes information that was not released throughout the season, meaning that data from post-storm reviews by the National Hurricane Center, such as a storm that was not initially warned upon, has been included.

By convention, meteorologists use one time zone when issuing forecasts and making observations: Coordinated Universal Time (UTC), and also use the 24-hour clock (where 00:00 = midnight UTC). In this time line, all information is listed by UTC first with the respective local time included in parentheses.

Timeline

May

May 23
 18:00 UTC (2:00 p.m.

May 26
 00:00 UTC (8:00 p.m. EDT May 25)The subtropical depression previously located to the southeast of Savannah, Georgia, is classified as a subtropical storm after it develops gale force winds.

May 26
 12:00 UTC (8:00 a.m.
 16:00 UTC (12:00 p.m. EDT)The National Hurricane Center (NHC) initiates advisories on the system, which is named Subtropical Storm Alpha.

May 28
 00:00 UTC (8:00 p.m. EDT, May 27)Subtropical Storm Alpha weakens into a subtropical depression, after it makes landfall near Brunswick, Georgia.
 02:00 UTC (10:00 p.m. EDT, May 27)The final advisory on Subtropical Depression Alpha as it moves into Florida.
 12:00 UTC (8:00 a.m.

May 29
 12:00 UTC (8:00 a.m. EDT)Subtropical Depression Alpha is last noted in the Gulf of Mexico, before it dissipates later that day.

June

June 1
 The 1972 Atlantic hurricane season officially begins.

June 14
 12:00 UTC (7:00 a.m. CDT)A tropical depression forms over the Yucatan Peninsula.

June 15
 18:00 UTC (1:00 p.m. CDT)The tropical depression emerges off the Yucatan Peninsula into the western Caribbean Sea with winds of 35 mph (55 km/h).

June 16
 12:00 UTC (7:00 a.m. CDT)The tropical depression strengthens into Tropical Storm Agnes.

June 18
 12:00 UTC (7:00 a.m. CDT)Tropical Storm Agnes strengthens into the first hurricane of the season.

June 19
 06:00 UTC (1:00 a.m.

 18:00 UTC (1:00 p.m.

June 20
 00:00 UTC (7:00 p.m CDT, June 19)Hurricane Agnes weakens into a tropical storm.
 06:00 UTC (1:00 a.m. CDT)Tropical Storm Agnes rapidly weakens into a tropical depression.

June 21
 18:00 UTC (2:00 p.m. EDT)Tropical Depression Agnes unexpectedly re-strengthens into a tropical storm while over eastern North Carolina.

June 22
 00:00 UTC (8:00 p.m. EDT, June 21)Tropical Storm Agnes emerges into the Atlantic Ocean near Nags Head, North Carolina.
 12:00 UTC (8:00 a.m.
 18:00 UTC (1:00 p.m.

June 23
 04:00 UTC, (12:00 a.m. EDT)The NHC issues its final advisory on Tropical Storm Agnes, after the system is absorbed by a developing extratropical cyclone over north-eastern Pennsylvania.

July
 No tropical cyclones form in the Atlantic Ocean during the month of July.

August

August 22
 12:00 UTC (9:00 a.m. ADT)A subtropical depression forms to the north of Bermuda.

August 24
 00:00 UTC (9:00 p.m. ADT, August 23)The subtropical depression strengthens into a Subtropical Storm Bravo.

August 25
 06:00 UTC (3:00 a.m. ADT)Subtropical Storm Bravo become tropical and is re-named Betty.

August 27
 12:00 UTC (9:00 a.m. ADT)Tropical Storm Betty strengthens into the second hurricane of the season.
 18:00 UTC (3:00 p.m. ADT)Hurricane Betty strengthens into a category 2 hurricane.

August 28
 00:00 UTC (9:00 p.m.

August 29
 12:00 UTC (8:00 a.m. EDT)A tropical depression forms to the west of Daytona Beach, Florida.
 18:00 UTC (3:00 p.m. ADT)Hurricane Betty weakens into a category 1 hurricane.

August 31
 00:00 UTC (8:00 p.m. EDT, August 30)The tropical depression strengthens into a Tropical Storm Carrie.

August 31
 00:00 UTC (9:00 p.m. ADT, August 30)Hurricane Betty weakens into a tropical storm.
 18:00 UTC (2:00 p.m.

September

September 1
 18:00 UTC (3:00 p.m. ADT)Tropical Storm Betty becomes extratropical in the frigid waters of the North Atlantic.
September 3
 18:00 UTC (2:00 p.m.

September 4
 00:00 UTC (9:00 p.m. ADT, September 3)Tropical Storm Carrie becomes extratropical.

September 5
 00:00 UTC (8:00 p.m. EDT, September 4)A tropical depression forms northeast of Santa Clara, Cuba.
 18:00 UTC (2:00 p.m.

September 6
 00:00 UTC (8:00 p.m. EDT, September 5)The tropical depression emerges off the Floridian coast into the North Atlantic.
 12:00 UTC (8:00 a.m. EDT)The tropical depression strengthens into Tropical Storm Dawn.

September 7
 18:00 UTC (2:00 p.m. EDT)Tropical Storm Dawn strengthens into the third and final hurricane of the season.

September 8
 00:00 UTC (8:00 p.m.

September 9
 00:00 UTC (8:00 p.m. EDT, September 8)Hurricane Dawn weakens into a tropical storm.

September 12
 18:00 UTC (2:00 p.m. EDT)Tropical Storm Dawn weakens into a tropical depression.September 14 12:00 UTC (8:00 a.m. EDT)Tropical Depression Dawn dissipates northeast of Charleston, South Carolina after having paralleled the Georgia and South Carolina coasts for the previous 24 hours.September 19 12:00 UTC (9:00 a.m. ADT)A subtropical depression forms northeast of Bermuda.September 20 00:00 UTC (9:00 p.m. ADT, September 19)The subtropical depression strengthens into Subtropical Storm Charlie.September 21 00:00 UTC (9:00 p.m. ADT, September 20)Subtropical Storm Charlie reaches its peak intensity, with maximum sustained winds of .September 21 06:00 UTC (3:00 a.m. ADT)Subtropical Storm Charlie becomes extratropical.

October
 No tropical cyclones form in the Atlantic Ocean during the month of October.

NovemberNovember 1 3:00 p.m. ADT (18:00 UTC (3:00 p.m. ADT)A subtropical depression forms in the central North Atlantic.November 2 00:00 UTC (9:00 p.m. ADT, November 1)The subtropical depression strengthens into Subtropical Storm Delta.
 12:00 UTC (9:00 a.m. ADT)Subtropical Storm Delta reaches its peak strength, with maximum sustained winds of .November 5 00:00 UTC (9:00 p.m. ADT, November 4)Subtropical Storm Delta weakens into a subtropical depression.November 7 18:00 UTC (3:00 p.m. ADT)Subtropical Depression Delta is last noted, before it dissipates well to the south-west of the Azores later that day.November 30'''
 The 1972 Atlantic hurricane season officially ends.

See also

 Lists of Atlantic hurricanes

Notes

References

1972 Atlantic hurricane season
1972 season timeline
Articles which contain graphical timelines